This is a list of all the American golfers who have played in the Curtis Cup through 2022.

Players 

^ In the final team but did not play in any matches.

The name in brackets is another surname used by the player.

See also 
Golf in the United States
List of Great Britain and Ireland Curtis Cup golfers
Lists of golfers

References

American
Curtis Cup, America
Curtis Cup, America
 
Golf